KCAH-LP (96.3 FM) is a radio station licensed to Carthage, Missouri, United States. The station is currently owned by Iglesia Cristiana Hispano-Americana.

References

External links
 

CAH-LP
CAH-LP
Radio stations established in 2008
2008 establishments in Missouri